The Stanrock Mine is an historical uranium mine located approximately 11.5 km northeast of Elliot Lake, Ontario, owned by Denison Mines. The site has been decommissioned and rehabilitated with ongoing monitoring by Denison Environmental Services.

the site was in operation from 1958 to 1964 as a traditional mining operation. Following the end of large scale drilling and blasting operations, the mine continued production using a leaching technique which utilized water and bacteria. Production contracts were fulfilled by 1970 and all operations ceased. The property was sold to Denison Mines in the early 1970s Total production was 6.4 million tonnes of ore.

Other mines in the area
 Stanleigh Mine
 Spanish American Mine
 Can-Met Mine
 Milliken Mine
 Panel Mine
 Denison Mine
 Quirke Mine(s)
 Pronto Mine
 Buckles Mine
 Lacnor Mine
 Nordic Mine

See also
Quartz-pebble conglomerate deposits
Uranium mining
List of uranium mines
List of mines in Ontario

References

External links
 MiningWatch Canada - Elliot Lake Uranium Mines
 CIM Bulletin - The Story of Elliot Lake
 The Gulliver Denison Mines Ltd Dossier

Uranium mines in Canada
Mines in Elliot Lake
Underground mines in Canada
Former mines in Ontario